The bearcat, also known as the binturong, is a viverrine mammal from Southeast Asia.

Bearcat or bearkat may also refer to:

Entertainment
 Bearcats!, a 1971 American TV series
 The Bearcat, a 1922 film starring Hoot Gibson
 "Do the Bearcat", a popular Canadian blues song written and performed by David Wilcox
 Bearcat Wright, a professional wrestler popular in the late 1950s and 1960s
 Keith Lee (wrestler), professional wrestler known as Bearcat Lee
 Bearcat (album), by Clifford Jordan

Locations
 Bearcat Base, a former U.S. Army base near the city of Biên Hòa in Đồng Nai Province in southern Vietnam

Technology
 AeroLites Bearcat, an American homebuilt aircraft design
 BearCat, a line of radio scanners produced by Uniden
 Grumman F8F Bearcat, a Grumman-built fighter aircraft used by the U.S. Navy
 Lenco BearCat, an armored personnel carrier
 Ruger Bearcat, a single-action .22 LR revolver
 Stutz Bearcat, an automobile produced by the Stutz Motor Company

Sports teams

Colleges
 Baruch Bearcats, at Baruch College
 Binghamton Bearcats, at Binghamton University
 Brescia Bearcats, at Brescia University
 Cincinnati Bearcats, at University of Cincinnati
 Columbia Bible College (Abbotsford, British Columbia)
 Lander University
 McKendree University
 Northwest Missouri State Bearcats, at Northwest Missouri State University
 Rust College
 Saint Vincent College
 Sam Houston State Bearkats, at Sam Houston State University
 Southwest Baptist Bearcats, at Southwest Baptist University
 Willamette University

High schools

 Aledo High School (Texas)
 Anderson County High School (Kentucky)
 Anson High School (North Carolina)
 Battle Creek Central High School, Michigan
 Ballinger High School, Texas  
 Bainbridge High School (Georgia)
 Bedford High School (Ohio)
 Bonita High School, California
 Booneville High School (Arkansas)
 Bossier High School (Louisiana)
 Bridgeport High School (Bridgeport, Michigan)
 Brookhaven High School (Columbus, Ohio)
 Brookland High School, Arkansas
 Brookland-Cayce High School, South Carolina
 Cullman High School, Alabama
 Douglas High School (Wyoming)
 Forest High School (Mississippi)
 Hendersonville High School (North Carolina)
 Henrietta Independent School District, Texas
 Hotchkiss School, Connecticut
 Huntingdon Area Senior High School, Pennsylvania
 International School Manila, the Philippines
 Johns Creek High School, Kentucky
 Kearney High School, Nebraska
 Kentucky Country Day School, Kentucky
 Klein High School, Texas
 Long Beach High School (Mississippi)
 Mena High School, Arkansas
 Monroe High School (Washington)
 Moody High School, Texas
 Muncie Central High School, Indiana
 North Butler High School, Iowa
Paint Valley High School, Ohio 
 Paso Robles High School, California
 Pilot Point High School, Texas
 Ray High School (Arizona)
 Raymondville Independent School District, Texas
 Rock Hill High School (South Carolina)
 Ruston High School, Louisiana
 San Mateo High School, California
 Sherman High School (Texas)
 Spencerville High School (Ohio) 
 Virginia High School (Virginia)
 Wheeler High School (Indiana)
 W. F. West High School, Washington
 Truro Bearcats, Truro

See also
Giant panda, also known as "bear cat" or "cat bear"
Red panda, also known as "cat-bear"